Eutropis quadratilobus is a species of skink found in Bhutan.

References

Eutropis
Reptiles described in 1992
Reptiles of Bhutan
Endemic fauna of Bhutan
Taxa named by Aaron M. Bauer
Taxa named by Rainer Günther